The 2017–18 1. FC Köln season is the 70th season in the football club's history and 4th consecutive and 47th overall season in the top flight of German football, the Bundesliga, having been promoted from the 2. Bundesliga in 2014. In addition to the domestic league, 1. FC Köln also are participating in this season's editions of the domestic cup, the DFB-Pokal, and the second-tier continental cup, the UEFA Europa League. This is the 70th season for Köln in the RheinEnergieStadion, located in Cologne, North Rhine-Westphalia, Germany. The season covers a period from 1 July 2017 to 30 June 2018.

Players

Squad information

Transfers

In

Out

Friendly matches

Competitions

Overview

Bundesliga

League table

Results summary

Results by round

Matches

DFB-Pokal

UEFA Europa League

Group stage

Statistics

Appearances and goals

! colspan="13" style="background:#DCDCDC; text-align:center" | Players transferred out during the season
|-

|}

Goalscorers

Clean sheets

Disciplinary record

References

1. FC Köln seasons
Köln, 1. FC
Köln, 1. FC